Noah Anderson (born 17 February 2001) is a professional Australian rules footballer playing for the Gold Coast Suns in the Australian Football League (AFL).

Early life
Anderson was born in Melbourne to mother Fiona and father Dean Anderson (two-time AFL premiership player). Anderson participated in the Auskick program at Glenferrie in Hawthorn, Victoria and played junior football for the Hawthorn Citizens Junior Football Club in the Yarra Junior Football League at a young age and made his first representative side when he was chosen to represent the under-12 Victorian state team. He attended Carey Grammar with future Gold Coast teammate Matthew Rowell throughout their teenage years.  As Anderson progressed through the junior ranks, he was given an opportunity to debut in the TAC Cup for the Oakleigh Chargers at 16 years of age. In 2019, he was named in the under-18 All-Australian team for his impressive performances in the AFL Under 18 Championships and played a pivotal role in Oakleigh's NAB League premiership season.

AFL career
Anderson was recruited by the Gold Coast Suns with the 2nd pick in the 2019 AFL draft, alongside best friend Matthew Rowell, who was also drafted by the Suns with the number 1 pick. Anderson made his AFL debut against Port Adelaide at Metricon Stadium in round 1 of the 2020 AFL season. Round 17 of the 2022 AFL season saw Anderson kick a goal after the siren to win the game against .

Statistics
Statistics are correct to the end of Round 23 2022

|- style="background:#EAEAEA"
| scope="row" text-align:center | 2020
| 
| 15 || 17 || 4 || 4 || 159 || 122 || 281 || 48 || 32 || 0.2 || 0.2 || 9.4 || 7.2 || 16.5 || 2.8 || 1.9 || 0
|-
| scope="row" text-align:center | 2021
| 
| 15 || 20 || 0 || 6 || 264 || 189 || 453 || 83 || 60 || 0.0 || 0.3 || 13.2 || 9.5 || 22.7 || 4.2 || 3.0 || 8
|- style="background:#EAEAEA"
| scope="row" text-align:center | 2022
| 
| 15 || 21 || 11 || 7 || 383 || 166 || 549 || 92 || 71 || 0.5 || 0.3 || 18.2 || 7.9 || 26.1 || 4.3 || 3.3 || 14
|- style="background:#EAEAEA; font-weight:bold; width:2em"
| scope="row" text-align:center class="sortbottom" colspan=3 | Career
| 58
| 15
| 17
| 806
| 477
| 1283
| 223
| 163
| 0.2
| 0.2
| 13.8
| 8.2
| 22.1
| 3.8
| 2.8
| 22
|}

Notes

References

External links

2001 births
Living people
Gold Coast Football Club players
Oakleigh Chargers players
Australian rules footballers from Melbourne
People educated at Carey Baptist Grammar School
People from the City of Boroondara